Milivojević is a Serbian patronymic surname derived from a masculine given name Milivoj. It may refer to:

Luka Milivojević (born 1991), footballer
Marko Milivojević, musician
Miloš Milivojević (born 1986), footballer

Serbian surnames
Slavic-language surnames
Patronymic surnames